This is a list of museums in Manitoba, Canada. There are nearly 200 museums in Manitoba, with over 40 in the City of Winnipeg alone.

For this context, museums are defined as institutions (including nonprofit organizations, government entities, and private businesses) that collect and care for objects of cultural, artistic, scientific, or historical interest and make their collections or related exhibits available for public viewing. Also included are non-profit art galleries and university art galleries.

Due to COVID-19 restrictions, all museums in Manitoba have been closed for extended periods of time throughout 2020 and 2021.

Overview
There are nearly 200 museums in Manitoba, with over 40 in the City of Winnipeg alone.

For this context, museums are defined as institutions (including nonprofit organizations, government entities, and private businesses) that collect and care for objects of cultural, artistic, scientific, or historical interest and make their collections or related exhibits available for public viewing. Also included are non-profit art galleries and university art galleries. These include art galleries; community museums; cultural centres; heritage centres; nature centres; historic buildings, sites, and parks; historical societies; natural history and science museums; and zoos. Moreover, their collections range from art and history to science and nature, from sports and leisure to transportation and industry.

Manitoba museums are also essential to the province's tourism industry.

The Association of Manitoba Museums (AMM; ; also known as Museums Manitoba) is the registered charitable organization and umbrella group that represents Manitoba's museum community. It is akin to the national Canadian Museums Association. AMM also operates a collections management software for museums in Manitoba called Musetoba, functioning as a shared database for the collections of five participating museums thus far. This project is funded in part by the federal Department of Canadian Heritage, The Winnipeg Foundation, and the provincial government's "Heritage Grants Program."

Current museums

Digital museums and collections
These are museums or collections that either exist only in cyberspace (i.e., virtual museums) or are virtual exhibitions provided by physical museums through their website. This does not include museums in Manitoba that have temporarily made their exhibits available online due to COVID-19 restrictions in 2020/2021.

Defunct museums

See also
Manitoba Historical Society
Archives of Manitoba
Nature centres in Manitoba
Canadian Museums Association
International Council of Museums

References

External links
 Association of Manitoba Museum official website

Manitoba
Lists of buildings and structures in Manitoba